Peter Switzer is an Australian business and financial commentator, radio and television presenter, lecturer, and author.

Switzer founded his own company The Switzer Group which has since grown into three diverse businesses involving media, financial services and investment management . Switzer also runs and is a contributor to self-titled website Switzer Daily, which boasts a number of contributors including media colleagues David Speers, Janine Perrett and Steve Price.

Switzer has also been a lecturer in economics at the University of New South Wales. He also hosted pre-recorded interviews which are available on the Qantas in-flight entertainment system for over a decade.

Switzer previously presented finance reports on the ARN and Triple M networks.

Published works
Who's afraid of the GST? (1998) (Prentice Hall) 
Small Business Start-up Guide : Secrets for Success (2002) (Allen & Unwin) 
Join the Rich Club (2019) (RUSSH Media)

References

Australian television journalists
Living people
Sky News Australia reporters and presenters
University of Western Australia alumni
Year of birth missing (living people)